GeTai Challenge 2015 is the first season of Singaporean singing reality competition GeTai Challenge that premiered on 25 May 2015 and run for 13 weeks, with the finals taped at Resorts World Sentosa on 13 August 2015 and ended on 17 August 2015. The competition features Getai singers from all across Singapore competing out for the title of GeTai Challenge winner. The show was hosted by Pornsak and Wang Weiliang, and guest host Shane Pow on two performance shows at Yishun.

On 16 August 2015, MediaCorp actor Desmond Ng was named the winner of GeTai Challenge and won a $20,000 cash award, with Love 97.2FM radio personality and actor Marcus Chin as runner-up and won $10,000. Taiwanese Getai singer Hao Hao, Mingzhu Sisters band member Michelle Choo, Indonesian Getai singer Wina Xie, and Malaysian Getai singer Lee Baoen were named third, fourth, fifth and sixth place, respectively. However, the finale drew criticism after a news article about the results was leaked out on The Straits Times the day before the finals was broadcast, causing a dismay among the netizens due to its spoiler nature.

Due to the success of the program and winning three major variety show awards in Star Awards 2016, the show was renewed for a second season, which premiered on 20 April 2018.

Development
The first season of GeTai Challenge was first announced in March 2015 and as a part of Singapore's golden jubilee celebrations. The show was notable for becoming the first show to be Getai-themed. Auditions were held in February 2015 and ten singers were chosen as the finalists of the show.

Contestants
The ten singers were announced on May.

Scoring chart

Red numbers indicate the lowest score for each week
Green numbers indicate the highest score for each week
 the singer eliminated that week
 the singer was placed in risk of elimination
 the winning singer
 the runner-up singer
 the third-place singer
 the fourth-place singer

Televised Show Details

Week 1- Prelude (25 May)
Week one features showcases of the ten performers and all three resident judges, Chen Hanwei, Liu Lingling and Wang Lei. The prelude showcase, along with the next two weeks, were taped at MPC@Khatib. Member of Parliament for Nee Soon GRC, and Parliament Secretary of Health and Transport Associate Professor Muhammad Faishal Ibrahim made his appearance for this episode.
Group Performances: "热情的沙漠" (Liu Lingling, Wang Lei, Leon & Febe, Marcus Chin, Michelle Choo, Hao Hao, Lee Baoen, Desmond Ng), "Rolling In the Deep" (Sherraine Law, Wina Xie, The Babes, 2Z Sisters), "一人一半" (Top 10)

Week 2/3- Themed Cumulative Round 1 (1/8 June)
Starting from week two, the ten singers will be judged based on their performance and assigned a score. The first four weeks will see singers split into two groups of five, each performing on either odd or even-numbered weeks, and then the singers performed together after week five. The scores were accumulated until week seven, and the two singers receiving the two lowest cumulative scores after six weeks will be eliminated from the competition. Getai organisers Tang Hu and Aaron Tan made their guest appearances on Week 2, followed by Love 97.2FM radio personalities Violet Chen and Chua Lilian on Week 3. Host Wang Weiliang was absent for the next two shows; actor Shane Pow took over him as the guest host.
Theme: Salute to Youths (dubbed as "Black Monday")

Week 4/5- Themed Cumulative Round 2 (15/22 June)
Week four marks the first show to be taped inside the MediaCorp Campus at Caldecott, and also the debut of the fourth resident judge Jim Lim. The performance order was determined through the scores on their first performance, starting from the highest scorer. Chinese singer Ling Xiao made their appearance on Week 4, and Getai singers Lin Ruping and Hsu Chiung-Fang on Week 5.

Group Performances: "你是我的花朵" (Week 4 singers), "姑娘的酒窝" (Week 5 singers)
Theme: Songs for their Loved Ones

Week 6- Themed Cumulative Round 3 (29 June)
For the next two weeks, two contestants were assigned as pairs to perform a duet. The first week were assigned by the production, and the second week through contestant's decision. The scores for both round was judged individually after each duet. Chen Hanwei was absent in the judging role for the next five weeks; FLY Entertainment artiste Irene Ang took his role for the judging panel for this week. Classic musician Chung Gu and band member John Teo made their appearance this week.

Group Performances: "爱神"
Theme: Contestants' duets: designated duets

Week 7- Themed Cumulative Round 4 (6 July)
Two acts were eliminated during the seventh week of shows, based on the cumulative scores as of this week. Students from Ngee Ann Polytechnic made their appearance this week.
Group Performances: "好好爱我"
Theme: Contestants' duets: freely-chosen songs

Week 8/9- Battle Rounds (13/20 July)
The Battle rounds was split into two episodes, and the round saw eight singers assigned into two groups of four. In this battle round, a singer would be sent by his or her teammates to compete against another singer from the opposing team. The selection of the singer and their order of appearance were all decided by their respective teams, and all of which were done without the knowledge of the opposing team. Therefore, the pairings were completely by random, and would only be revealed when the teams revealed their selection on stage. At the end of each match, the winning singer will earn the right to decide whether the singer will perform first or second. At the end of all four matches, the group with a higher combined total will directly advance to the semi-finals, while singers from the losing group would have to compete in the Second Chance Judges Challenge next week. Additionally, the scores for the prior round were reset. Ah Boys to Men actor Tosh Zhang was brought in as the guest judge.

Group Performances: "失恋阵线联盟"
Theme: "Four hands fights" (No theme)
 Color key

Won by a Rock–paper–scissors tiebreaker.

Week 10- Second Chance Judges Challenge (27 July)
In this round, the four singers who were defeated in the Battle Rounds performed for a chance to stay in the competition. Singers who attained at least 80 points will advance to the semi-finals. Musician Allen Moo was brought in as the guest judge.
Group Performances: "真心英雄"
Theme: "Songs to get you to the semi-final" (no theme, dubbed as "Real gold is not afraid of the fire")

 Color key

At the end of the challenge, Xie would have been eliminated from the competition after she failed the challenge, but was later advanced to the semi-finals following the audience and judges’ deliberation to bring all the singers to the semi-finals.

Week 11/12- Semi-finals (3/10 August)
The semi-final round was split into two episodes, with the first five singers performing on the first episode, and the last three on the second episode. For this round, singers a medley of songs which were assigned by the judges, starting off their performances with a ballad, followed by an uptempo song. In deciding who moves on, each judge will cast their vote by flashing the show's logo on their smartphones. Singers receiving a minimum of four (out of five) judges' votes will directly advance to the grand finals; failure to will land them in the Pending Zone, where singers have to perform again in the 90-second sing-off. After the sing-off, the judges choose which two singers advanced to the grand final, and which two singers were to be eliminated. Irene Ang was brought in as the guest judge.

Group Performances: "给我一个吻"
Theme: Fast and Slow-tempo medley songs, judges' assigned

 Color key

Originally cast as a "No" vote. Chin's results was not revealed until Episode 12 (10 August).

Week 13- Grand Finals

Part 1- The Ultimate Battle (16 August)
The grand finals were taped on 13 August 2015 at Resorts World Sentosa and broadcast on a three-hour special starting at 7.00pm. In the first round of the competition, the six finalists performed a duet or trio with celebrities (if any). Based on the judges scores in the first round, the bottom two singers with the lowest judges' score would be eliminated.

The final four singers would then sing their winner's song in the second round of the competition; the singer who received the highest total combined score was announced as the winner. Local musician Eric Moo was brought in as a guest judge. Local musician Lee Wei Song and the cast of Ah Boys to Men made their appearance in the finale. Minister of the Prime Minister Office Chan Chun Sing was the guest-of-honour for the finale.

Group Performances: "给我感觉" (The Babes, Leon & Febe, Sherraine Law, 2Z Sisters), "至少还有你" (Marcus Chin, Michelle Choo), "爱什么稀罕" (Lee Baoen, Wina Xie), "不让我眼泪我过夜" (Desmond Ng), "寒江雪" (Hao Hao), "跟着感觉走" (Top 10)
Theme: Celebrity duet (dubbed as "reinforcement round"), winner's song (dubbed as "final battle")
Guest Performance: Eric Moo ("太傻")

Part 2- Finals Special (17 August)
The Finals Special was aired the following day of the finale, featuring a clip show as well as a look-back on their journey in the competition, and to celebrate the success of the season and the crowning of the winner. The results for the three voting categories, which opened throughout the season until the semi-finals, was revealed in the episode.

References

2015 Singaporean television seasons